A series of suspected bombs exploded outside the office of the Chinese Communist Party in Taiyuan, Shanxi, on 6 November 2013. The blast killed at least 1 and another 8 were injured. A 41-year-old Taiyuan resident, Feng Zhijun, was arrested on 8 November.

Attack
At 7:40 am, six improvised explosive devices detonated outside the Communist Party's 20-story provincial headquarters. One person was killed, and eight others were injured.

Suspect
41-year-old Feng Zhijun was arrested on the morning of 8 November 2013 in connection with the bombing. He confessed to setting off the explosions. Feng was a resident of Xinghualing District in Taiyuan, and is a convicted thief.

See also
2013 Tiananmen Square attack

References

Improvised explosive device bombings in China
Taiyuan
2013 murders in China